Chalappuram is a suburb of Kozhikode city in India.

Location
Chalappuram is situated on the south of the city on Kallai road.  The road going east from Pushpa junction connects to Chalappuram Post Office and P.V.Samy Road.  This road is also connected to Mankavu junction.

The road going west of Pushpa junction is called Francis Road which connects Chalappuram with the Kuttichira and Kozhikode beaches.  Annie Hall Road connects Chalappuram to the railway station.

Samooham Road connects to Tali temple and Palayam areas.  There is a Link Road between Palayam and the railway station which is travelers corner in the city.  This road came into existence because of the courageous and painstaking efforts taken by the former District Collector of Kozhikode Shri. Amitabh Kanth.

Palayam Junction
Palayam junction has a vegetable market and a minor bus station.  This junction is directly connected to Mananchira Pond by the Muthalakkulam route. Ahmediya Mosque and Touring Book Stall are situated in this area.   Moulana Mohammed Ali Road connects Palayam to Mavoor Road.

See also
 Kallayi
 Beypore
 Nallalam

Important Landmarks
 Tali Shiva Temple
 Mahaganapathi Balasubramanya Temple
 Kokkozhikode Siva Temple, Mooriyad Road
 Govt.Ganapath High School for Boys
 National Child Development Council
Pushpa Junction
 Chalappuram sree krishna temple,Mooriyad Road

Location

References 

Kozhikode downtown